Sergei Vasilyevich Bazulev (born 10 October 1957) is a former Russian professional footballer.

Honours
 Soviet Top League champion: 1989.
 Soviet Top League runner-up: 1983, 1984, 1991.

European club competitions
With FC Spartak Moscow.

 UEFA Cup 1989–90: 3 games.
 European Cup 1990–91: 8 games.

External links
 

1957 births
Living people
Soviet footballers
Russian footballers
Soviet expatriate footballers
Russian expatriate footballers
Expatriate footballers in Finland
Soviet Top League players
FC Asmaral Moscow players
FC Spartak Moscow players
FC Lokomotiv Moscow players
People from Lyubertsy
Association football defenders
Oulun Luistinseura players
Neftçi PFK players
FC Spartak Kostroma players
Sportspeople from Moscow Oblast
FC Dynamo Kirov players